"Killing in the Name" is a protest song by American rock band Rage Against the Machine, and appears on their 1992 self-titled debut album. It was released as the lead single from the album in November 1992. It features heavy drop-D guitar riffs, and lyrics inspired by the police brutality suffered by Rodney King and the subsequent 1992 Los Angeles riots.

"Killing in the Name" is Rage Against the Machine's signature song. In 1993, it reached number 25 on the UK Singles Chart. In 2009, following a campaign protesting the British talent show The X Factor, "Killing in the Name" reached the UK Christmas number one.

Writing 
Tom Morello wrote the guitar riffs while teaching a student drop D tuning; he briefly paused the lesson to record the riff. The band worked on the song the next day. According to Morello, "Killing in the Name" was a collaborative effort, combining his riff with Tim Commerford's "magmalike" bass, Brad Wilk's "funky, brutal" drumming and vocalist Zack de la Rocha's "conviction". Morello recorded his part on a Fender Telecaster.

Music 
"Killing in the Name" has been described as alternative metal, rap metal, rap rock, hard rock and nu metal song. The journalist Peter Buckley described it as "a howling, expletive-driven tirade against the ills of American society". The song builds in intensity, as de la Rocha chants the line "Fuck you, I won't do what you tell me", building in a crescendo the next four times and angrily screaming the line the final eight times, culminating with the scream "Motherfucker!" The song contains the word "fuck" 16 times.

The lyrics were inspired by the police brutality suffered by Rodney King and the subsequent 1992 Los Angeles riots. The refrain "some of those that work forces are the same that burn crosses" draws a link between the Los Angeles Police Department and the Ku Klux Klan. According to BBC News, "Killing in the Name" rails against "the military–industrial complex, justifying killing for the benefit of, as the song puts it, the chosen whites".

Artwork 
The cover of the CD single is Malcolm Browne's Pulitzer Prize-winning photograph of Thích Quảng Đức's self-immolation in Saigon in 1963 in protest of the murder of Buddhists by the U.S.-backed regime of Prime Minister Ngo Dinh Diem. The photograph also appears on cover of the eponymous Rage Against the Machine album. The cover of the Australian version of the CD-single has the words "killing in the name", in large, red block capitals, and a much smaller and tightly cropped version of the photograph in the bottom right-hand corner.

Release 
"Killing in the Name" was originally released as part of a 12-song self-released cassette. The band's first video for "Killing in the Name" did not receive heavy airplay in the United States due to the explicit lyrics. The song received substantial airplay in Europe and drove the band's popularity outside its home country.

After signing with Epic Records, the band released their self-titled debut album on November 12, 1992. It reached triple platinum status, driven by heavy radio play of "Killing in the Name". The album also included the singles "Freedom" and "Take the Power Back".

Controversies 
 
On February 21, 1993, BBC Radio 1 DJ Bruno Brookes accidentally played the full uncensored version of the song on his Top 40 Countdown, leading to 138 complaints. Brookes was recording an advertisement for the following week's Top 40 Countdown while the song played. The incident has subsequently been referred to by numerous British rock media. The song drew controversy again in Britain in November 2008, when it was played over the speakers in an Asda supermarket in Preston, Lancashire, prompting numerous complaints from customers. Asda subsequently issued an apology.

In 2012, Morello demanded the right-wing UK Independence Party stop using "Killing in the Name" in rallies. Following the 2020 United States elections, a video of pro-Trump protesters dancing to "Killing in the Name" was widely shared on social media. Commentators saw it as a misappropriation of the song; Rage Against the Machine responded in a tweet: "They just don't GET IT do they?"

In 2022, Reuters Fact Check team concluded that a viral video purportedly showing North Korea’s military choir covering the song has been digitally altered. The music audio comes a video uploaded to YouTube in 2019 from an event when thousand musicians gathered to perform the song inside Frankfurt’s Deutsche Bank Park and the montage of clips of the large choir and footage of the North Korea's military arsenal, such as tanks and missiles which have been edited together to mislead viewers, Reuters say.

2009 UK Christmas number one campaign 

In early December 2009, English DJ Jon Morter and his wife Tracy launched a group on the social networking site Facebook encouraging people to buy the song in the week before Christmas. They hoped to prevent the winner of The X Factor, a televised singing competition, from achieving the UK Christmas number one for the fifth year running. On December 15, the BBC reported the group had more than 750,000 members.

As the X Factor song was donating some of the profits to charity, the Rage Against X Factor campaign encouraged supporters also to give to charity. Alongside the group, a Justgiving page was created to raise money for homeless charity Shelter which, as of 20 December, had raised over £70,000 (approximately $110,000).

After X Factor creator Simon Cowell denounced the campaign as "stupid" and "cynical", the group gained more attention and was mentioned on various UK news channels, radio stations and websites. Rage Against the Machine added their support. Morello said that achieving the Christmas number one would be "a wonderful dose of anarchy" and that he planned to donate the unexpected windfall to charity. Dave Grohl, Muse, Them Crooked Vultures, Liam Howlett and The Prodigy were among many musicians and celebrities supporting the campaign. The campaign received support from Paul McCartney, who had appeared on The X Factor with the finalists, and X Factor contestants Jedward. Critics noted that both The X Factor and Rage Against the Machine are signed to labels that are part of Sony BMG; Morello dismissed conspiracy claims as ridiculous. Kasabian's Tom Meighan and Sergio Pizzorno expressed their happiness at the campaign's success in an NME interview and criticised The X Factor.

Rage Against the Machine attracted controversy when they performed an uncensored rendition of the song on BBC Radio 5 Live in mid-December 2009, despite the hosts asking them to censor the expletives. During the crescendo of their performance, frontman Zack De La Rocha started out only singing "I won't do what you tell me", with a pause where he normally sings "fuck you", but after a few lines, he screamed the lyrics, "Fuck you, I won't do what you tell me" repeatedly. Hosts Nicky Campbell and Shelagh Fogarty apologized afterwards.

On December 20, 2009, BBC Radio 1 revealed that the song had reached the number one spot, selling more than 500,000 copies and being the first download-only single to become the UK Christmas number one. The following week, Joe McElderry's cover of "The Climb" became the last British UK number one single of the year and the 2000s. "Killing in the Name" dropped to number two, falling 38 places to number 40 the week after, and dropping out of the top 75 the following week, falling to number 100.

The campaign spread to Ireland, where, like the UK, the Christmas number one had been dominated by X Factor finalists for five years. The campaign was less successful in Ireland and McElderry beat Rage Against the Machine to Christmas number one, with Rage Against the Machine reaching number two.

On June 6, 2010, Rage Against the Machine performed at a free concert for 40,000 fans in Finsbury Park. On stage, Tracy and Jon Morter were handed a representative cheque in the amount of £162,713.03, representing the proceeds from donations to JustGiving and royalties from sales of the single.

As a result of the campaign, the song is featured in the 2011 UK edition of the Guinness World Records under the category of 'Fastest-selling digital track (UK)', after recording 502,672 downloads in its first week.

Music video 
The video, produced and directed by Peter Gideon, a guitar student of Tom Morello who had a video camera, was filmed during two shows in small Los Angeles venues, the Whisky a Go Go and the Club With No Name. Released in December 1992, the uncensored version of the video clip was shown on European MTV but was banned on American MTV because of the explicit lyrics. As a result, the video's existence was in doubt until its release on Rage Against the Machine: The Video.

In 2021, in a collaboration with the arts collective the Ummah Chroma, Rage Against the Machine released a 15-minute short documentary video about the making of "Killing in the Name." The video features anti-racist activist Tim Wise and contains footage of an interview with Zach de la Rocha, who says that capitalist society "should not stand. It should be challenged and questioned and overthrown."

Accolades 
In July 2009, "Killing in the Name" was voted at number two in the Hottest 100 of all time countdown poll, conducted by Australian radio station, Triple J. More than half a million votes were cast. The song was also voted at number 17 in the 1998 edition of Hottest 100 of All Time and was voted number 6 on the Hottest 100 list in 1993.

In 2007, "Killing in the Name" earned a spot on Guitar Worlds list of the "100 Greatest Guitar Solos" at number 89.

In 2002, Rolling Stone magazine listed "Killing in the Name" as the 24th in its 100 Greatest Guitar Songs of All Time and as the 207th in its "Top 500 Greatest Songs of All Time".

In 2010, the New Statesman listed it as number 12 on their list of the "Top 20 Political Songs" as voted for by the Political Studies Association.

In 2010, 2011, and 2012, The Rock radio station in New Zealand held the Rock 1,000 countdown which counts down the top 1,000 rock songs of all time, as voted by the public; in 2010 and 2011, the song was in the top five, while in 2012, the song was number seven. In 2011 and 2012, "Killing in the Name" was played uncensored, with a preceding message from the prime minister, John Key, approving the playing of the uncensored version of the song due to the large number of complaints received by MediaWorks New Zealand regarding the 2010 countdown not giving any warning that the song was uncensored. In 2017, "Killing in the Name" made it to number 1 in the Rock 1500 and was presented by long serving broadcaster, Roger Farrelly. In 2021, "Killing in the Name" made it to number 1 in The Rock 2,000.

In 2021, the UK Official Charts Company announced that "Killing in the Name" had been named as the 'UK's Favourite Christmas Number 1 of All Time' in a poll commissioned to celebrate the 70th Official Christmas Number 1 race (and as a tie-in with the book The Official Christmas No. 1 Singles Book by Michael Mulligan).

Live performances

The song was performed as an extended instrumental at their first public performance at Cal State in the Quad, on October 23, 1991. Bassist Tim Commerford is known to chant the backing vocals of "now you do what they told ya" of the chorus during most live performances.

Zack de la Rocha sometimes changes the lyrics in the second verse from "Some of those that work forces are the same that burn crosses" to "Some of those that burn crosses are the same that hold office" when playing live.

As part of supergroup Audioslave, guitarist Tom Morello incorporated instrumentals from Rage Against the Machine including versions of "Killing in the Name" into their performances.

Rage Against the Machine performed the song live in 1999 at the Woodstock '99 festival, burning the American flag during the song. In this performance, de la Rocha changed the lyrics to "Some of those that work forces are the same that burn churches".

Track listing

"Darkness of Greed" and "Clear the Lane" were re-mastered versions of the respective demo tracks. Another version of "Darkness of Greed", titled merely "Darkness", was included on the 1994 soundtrack album for The Crow. The previously unreleased demo appeared on the XX 20th Anniversary Edition of their debut album, which was released on November 27, 2012.

Personnel 

 Zack de la Rocha – lead vocals
 Tom Morello – guitar
 Tim Commerford – bass guitar, backing vocals
 Brad Wilk – drums

Charts

Certifications

Other uses 

During one of his last performances before he died, American comedian Bill Hicks ended a set by smashing his microphone against a stool while singing along to "Killing in the Name" playing over the loudspeakers.

As part of the US War on Terror, the song was used by military interrogators at the Guantanamo Bay detention camp. Music was played at painfully high volume levels for hours on end, as a form of psychological torture. "The fact that music I helped create was used in crimes against humanity sickens me," noted Morello.

During the 2019–20 Chilean protests, the song was covered with some of the lyrics modified alluding to the Chilean police force's misuse of violence in repressing peaceful protestors.

On June 29, 2022, a Vancouver radio station, KISS-FM, stunted by repeatedly played “Killing In The Name” for 30 hours. The song was repeatedly played on loop after the station dropped its hot adult contemporary format, resulting in the firing of its airstaff. The station occasionally paused the loop to take call-in requests, only to continue playing the song. At 6:00 AM PDT on June 30, 2022, the station rebranded to "Sonic Radio", which plays a modern rock format.

Cover versions and parodies 

 In July 2007, a remix of the song by SebastiAn (miscredited as a Mr. Oizo remix) was Zane Lowe's "Hottest Record in the World" on his show on BBC Radio 1.
 In June 2007, funk band The Apples from Tel Aviv, Israel, released a cover on a 7" vinyl on Freestyle Records.
 On 22 August 2008, Scottish alt-rock band Biffy Clyro performed a re-worked acoustic cover version of "Killing in the Name" on Jo Whiley's show at The Reading Festival on BBC Radio 1. The band agreed that, for this live broadcast, they would not use expletives and sung just the melody in place of "Fuck you" in the song. The crowd were bound by no such agreement and began an impromptu mass sing along with "Fuck you" in place, audible by the recording equipment. As this broadcast was going out live at lunchtime, Jo Whiley was required to apologize on air after the performance.
 French band La Maison Tellier released a country-folk version of "Killing in the Name" in their first album (2006).
 In 2008, Icelandic electronica group FM Belfast released a single called "Lotus", a minimal electro cover version of "Killing in the Name".
 Slovak DJ and producer L-Plus released a drum and bass remix of "Killing in the Name" in 2008.
 Australian rock group FourPlay String Quartet recorded a version of the song for their 2009 album Fourthcoming.
 On July 4, 2010, American jam band Phish covered the song after introducing Rage Against the Machine as "one of the only other bands, other than Phish, that won't bullshit you."
 New York-based band Emmure covered the song at the Hoodwink Festival along with "Bulls on Parade".
 Zac Brown Band has covered the song on several occasions during their live performances.
 Richard Cheese recorded a version the song in the style of lounge music for his 2011 album A Lounge Supreme.
 Bonded by Blood covered the song in their 2012 album The Aftermath.
 Lauren Mayberry recorded a cover version of the song along with her band, Blue Sky Archives.
 Limp Bizkit covered the song live at Download Festival 2013 and Reading and Leeds Festival 2015.
 Prophets of Rage, an American rap rock supergroup, formed in 2016 and including several former members of RATM, recorded a live rendition of "Killing in the Name" in 2016.
 Starbomb parodied the song, titling it "Filling in the Name Of". The song is about "a long Tetris piece who begins to lament his place in life after being used constantly to finish Tetris puzzles". It was released on the group's third and final album The Tryforce in 2019
 Machine Gun Kelly and Blink-182 drummer Travis Barker covered this song in 2020 as part of a protest movement preceded by the murder of George Floyd by a local US police.

References

External links 

 
 

Rage Against the Machine songs
1992 debut singles
1992 songs
Christmas number-one singles in the United Kingdom
Songs about police officers
Songs about police brutality
Criticism of police brutality
Epic Records singles
Protest songs
Songs against capitalism
Songs against racism and xenophobia
UK Singles Chart number-one singles
Song recordings produced by Garth Richardson
Songs written by Tom Morello
Songs written by Brad Wilk
Songs written by Tim Commerford
Songs written by Zack de la Rocha
Obscenity controversies in music
Music controversies